Karl Piutti (30 April 1846, Elgersburg – 17 June 1902, Leipzig) was a German composer and organist.

Piutti studied at the Leipzig Conservatory. He taught at his alma mater from 1875 onwards, and also became the organist at the Thomaskirche after 1880.

His compositions comprised some two hundred preludes, a Trauungsonate (Wedding Sonata), and a piece titled Die Pfingstfeier (Pentecostal Celebration), all for organ; motets; settings of Psalms; lieder; and pieces for piano.

Selected works

Choral
Two Psalms, op. 30 
Das ist mir lieb (Psalm 116) 
Jauchzet dem Herrn (Psalm 100) 
Two Motets, op. 33 
Selig sind die Toten 
Die auf den Herrn harren

Organ
Die Trauung, op. 9, cycle of four pieces in the form of a sonata
10 Improvisations on a Well-Known Chorale, op. 15 
Preludes and Fugue, op. 16 "Die Pfingstfeier" 
Fest-Hymnus, op. 20 
Organ Sonata in G major, op. 22 
Organ Sonata in E minor, op. 27 
10 Short Pieces for Organ, op. 32 
200 Choralvorspiele, op. 34

External links

1846 births
1902 deaths
German Romantic composers
German classical organists
German male organists
German male classical composers
19th-century German musicians
20th-century German male musicians
19th-century German male musicians
Male classical organists
19th-century organists